A list of mainland Chinese films released in 2003:

See also 
 2003 in China

References

External links
IMDb list of Chinese films

Chinese
Films
2003